Sandy Lane is a civil parish in the metropolitan borough of the City of Bradford, West Yorkshire, England.  It contains eight listed buildings that are recorded in the National Heritage List for England.  All the listed buildings are designated at Grade II, the lowest of the three grades, which is applied to "buildings of national importance and special interest".  The parish contains the village of Sandy Lane and the surrounding countryside.  All the listed buildings are houses, cottages, farmhouses and farm buildings.


Buildings

References

Citations

Sources

Lists of listed buildings in West Yorkshire